Niccolò Francesco Missanelli (died 1577) was a Roman Catholic prelate who served as Bishop of Policastro (1543–1577).

Biography
On 7 Jun 1543, Niccolò Francesco Missanelli was appointed by Pope Paul III as Bishop of Policastro. In 1545, he was consecrated bishop. He served as Bishop of Policastro until his death in 1577.

References 

16th-century Italian Roman Catholic bishops
1577 deaths
Bishops appointed by Pope Paul III